Pentaceros japonicus, the Japanese armorhead or Japanese boarfish, is a species of armorhead native to the western Pacific Ocean from southern Japan south to New Zealand and Australia. It is a commercially important species and can be found in the aquarium trade.

References

japonicus
Fish described in 1883